Vezzano refers to several towns in Italy:

Vezzano, Trentino
Vezzano Ligure
Vezzano sul Crostolo